The Europa postage stamp (also known as Europa - CEPT until 1992) is an annual joint issue of stamps with a common design or theme by postal administrations of member countries of the European Communities (1956–1959), the European Conference of Postal and Telecommunications Administrations (CEPT) from 1960 to 1992, and the PostEurop Association since 1993. Europe is the central theme.

EUROPA stamps underlines cooperation in the posts domain, taking into account promotion of philately. They also build awareness of the common roots, culture and history of Europe and its common goals. As such, EUROPA stamp issues are among the most collected and most popular stamps in the world.

Since the first issue in 1956, EUROPA stamps have been a tangible symbol of Europe's desire for closer integration and cooperation.

History

From 1956 to 1993

The first Europa issue was on 15 September 1956. The postal administrations of the founding six members of the European Coal and Steel Community (ECSC) issued stamps with a common design: a tower made up of the letters of the word "EUROPA" and surrounded by construction scaffolding.

In 1959, the European Conference of Postal and Telecommunications Administrations (CEPT) was formed, and from 1960 the initials "CEPT" were displayed on the joint issue stamps.

The stamps had a common design from 1956 to 1973, (with the exception of 1957). However, many countries issued a stamp that did not feature the common pattern but just displayed the word "EUROPA". From 1974, the common design was replaced by stamps with different designs, but with a common theme.

The success of Europa issues among collectors prompted many postal administrations of small countries or territories dependent of European countries (the Channel Islands for instance) to join the issuing countries in the 70s. Andorra has issued Europa Stamps since 1966 (French) and 1972 (Spain). Andorra cannot Join PostEurop as its Postal System is looked after independently by both France and Spain.  The Isle of Man and Guernsey, Crown dependencies of the United Kingdom, first issued Europa stamps in 1976, with Jersey following in 1978. The number of participants reached 35 in the 80s. Turkey participated continuously since 1960, and Yugoslavia from 1969. The collapse of the communist bloc in 1989–90 brought new issuers, reaching 57 countries in the late 90s.

Since 1993
When CEPT decided to focus more on telecommunications in 1993, PostEurop took over the management of the Europa issues. The CEPT logo was replaced by a new logo created by PostEurop, i.e. the word "EUROPA" leaning to the right.

Although in 2006 the member countries of PostEurop chose the theme of "Integration as seen by young people" instead of a theme related to the 50th anniversary of Europa issues, several countries issued stamps showing the first common designs of the years 1950–1970. An anniversary logo (the number 50 in the middle of a star with 5 branches) is also featured on these stamps.

In order to promote Europa issues among philatelists, PostEurop created in 2002 an annual competition of the “Best Europa stamp”. Since 2005, several non-European countries and non-PostEurop Members have issued stamps in connection with this anniversary. In Europe, some countries, including Serbia, Montenegro, Albania, Armenia, Moldova, Gibraltar, Cyprus, etc. also participated in these issues.

Until 2006, only representatives of the various postal administrations were entitled to elect the best Europa stamp during the Plenary Assembly of PostEurop, but since 2007, the winner is elected through an open and public voting procedure on the PostEurop website.

From January 2011, the new EUROPA logo, preceded by a symbolic reminder of the mailbox, applies, and a Jury Prize Competition is designed by seven philatelic experts.

Common design issues (with the exception of 1957)

Common theme issues of CEPT (with the exception of 1984)

Common theme issues of PostEurop (with the exception of 2000 and 2016)
The list includes the jury and online competition winners since 2002 when the EUROPA stamp competition started.

References

Sources
 Stanley Gibbons Ltd: various catalogues
 AskPhil – Glossary of Stamp Collecting Terms
 Encyclopaedia of Postal History
 Stuart Rossiter & John Flower: The Stamp Atlas
 PostEurop's website

Further reading
 Europa CEPT, PostEurop 2005: Thematic Stamps Catalogue; specialized. Sabadell, Barcelona, Spain: Domfil, 2004 , 392p.
 Europa Study Unit. Europa Stamps. Milwaukee, WI.: American Topical Association, 1962, 35p.
 Schneider, Andreas. Europa-Thematik Spezialkatalog. Essen: A. Schneider, 1982, 267p.
 Staedal, Paul. Europe-Philatelie III: Spezial Katalog der Europaischen Briefmarken und Sonderstempel. Strasbourg: Europa F. D. C. Service, 1976–77

External links

 CEPT. Conference of European Postal & Telecommunications
 PostEurop Web site
 SelloSpain.com: Spanish Europa issued stamps (archived)
 Europa stamps news and information blog
 Philatelism.com: Europa stamps of Cyprus 

Postage stamps
1956 introductions